AYM or aym may refer to:

 Aymara language, spoken in Bolivia, Peru and Chile
  The Alliance for Youth Movements, now known as Movements.org
 Achcham Yenbadhu Madamaiyada, a 2016 Indian Tamil-language film
 Angry young men, a British literary movement
 Anglesey Mining, a British mining company
 Aym (demon), in the Ars Goetia book of demonology
 Yas Island Seaplane Base, United Arab Emirates (IATA code: AYM)

People with the surname Aym

 Zighen Aym (born 1957), Algerian writer and engineer